In Greek mythology, Leiagore or Leiagora (Ancient Greek: Ληαγόρη Lêagorê means 'assembler' or addressing the people') was the Nereid of assembling (fish or navies). She was one of the 50 marine-nymph daughters of the 'Old Man of the Sea' Nereus and the Oceanid Doris.

Notes

References 

 Hesiod, Theogony from The Homeric Hymns and Homerica with an English Translation by Hugh G. Evelyn-White, Cambridge, MA.,Harvard University Press; London, William Heinemann Ltd. 1914. Online version at the Perseus Digital Library. Greek text available from the same website.
Kerényi, Carl, The Gods of the Greeks, Thames and Hudson, London, 1951.

Nereids